Quadricoccus is a genus of gram-negative, oxidase-negative, catalase-positive, aerobic,  non-spore-forming, non-motile bacteria from the family of Rhodocyclaceae which belongs to the class of Betaproteobacteria. So far there is only on species of this genus known (Quadricoccus australiensis).

References

Monotypic bacteria genera
Bacteria genera
Rhodocyclaceae